Richard Bacach Burke, 11th Clanricarde or Mac William Uachtar (died 1538) was an Irish chieftain and noble who was the ancestor of the Burkes of County Galway.

Background
Burke was a son of Ulick Fionn Burke, 6th Clanricarde (d.1509). He succeeded his cousin's son, John mac Richard Mór Burke, 10th Clanricarde, as chieftain in 1538. Richard was deposed in 1538 by his nephew, Ulick na gCeann Burke, 12th Clanricarde (d.1544). 

All subsequent chiefs of the Galway Burkes and Earls of Clanricarde would descend from Ulick while Richard Bachach's descendants disappeared into obscurity.

Family tree

   Ulick Ruadh Burke, d. 1485
    |
    |
    |                      |                        |                        |                 |
    |                      |                        |                        |                 |
    Edmund, d. 1486.       Ulick Fionn          Meiler, Abbot of Tuam      John, d. 1508.   Ricard Og, d. 1519.
    |                      |                                                                   |
    |                      |___            |_
    Ricard, d. c. 1517.    |                          |              |            |            |                |
    |                      |                          |              |            |            |                |
    |                      Ulick Óge, d. 1519.    Richard Mór   Redmond   Richard Bacach    Ulick, d. 1551.  Thomas
    John, fl. 1536.                                   |                           |            |                |
                                                      |                           |            |                |
                                                 Ulick na gCeann         Roland, Bp. Clonfert. Thomas Balbh  John of Derrymaclaghtna
                                                      |                         died 1580                       |
                           ___|_                            |
                           |                    |     |               |             |                       Ricard, d. 1593.
                           |                    |     |               |             |                           |
                          Richard Sassanach   John  Thomas Feranta  Edmond   Redmond na Scuab         (Burke of Derrymaclaghtna)
                           | d. 1582.                 d. 1546.                  d. 1596.
                           |
                       Earls of Clanricarde         

 Richard an Fhorbhair de Burgh (d.1343)
 Sir William (Ulick) de Burgh (d. 1343/53), 1st Mac William Uachtar (Upper Mac William) or Clanricarde (Galway)
 Richard Óg Burke (d. 1387), 2nd Clanricarde
 Ulick an Fhiona Burke (d. 1424), 3rd Clanricarde
 Ulick Ruadh Burke (d. 1485), 5th Clanricarde
 Edmund Burke (d. 1466)
 Ricard of Roscam (d. 1517)
 John mac Richard Mór Burke (d. 1536), 10th Clanricarde
 Ulick Fionn Burke (d.1509), 6th Clanricarde
 Ulick Óge Burke (d. 1520), 8th Clanricarde
 Richard Mór Burke (d. 1530), 9th Clanricarde
 Ulick na gCeann Burke (d. 1544), 12th Clanricarde, 1st Earl of Clanricarde (1543)
 Richard Bacach Burke (d. 1538), 11th Clanricarde
 Richard Óge Burke (d. 1519), 7th Clanricarde
 Sir Uilleag Burke (d. 1551), 13th Clanricarde
 William mac Ulick Burke (d. 1430), 4th Clanricarde
 Edmund de Burgh (d. 1410)

References

Further reading
 Burke, Eamon "Burke People and Places", Dublin, 1995.
 A New History of Ireland, IX, p.172, Oxford, 1984.

16th-century Irish people
People from County Galway
Richard Bacach
1538 deaths
Year of birth unknown